Aloe modesta is a species of flowering plant in the family Asphodelaceae. This plant is rare and only known in Mpumalanga and northern KwaZulu-Natal in South Africa.

References

modesta